The forest rock thrush (Monticola sharpei) is a songbird in the family Muscicapidae, formerly placed in the Turdidae together with the other chats. It now includes Benson's rock thrush and  Amber Mountain rock thrush as subspecies.

It is endemic to Madagascar. The type locality is the forests east of Ambatondrazaka, which in turn lies south of Lake Alaotra.

Its natural habitats are subtropical or tropical moist lowland forest and subtropical or tropical moist montane forest.

Gallery

References

forest rock thrush
Endemic birds of Madagascar
forest rock thrush
forest rock thrush
Taxonomy articles created by Polbot